The Suram Fortress (Suramis tsikhe) is a 1922 Soviet Georgian adventure film directed by Ivan Perestiani, based on Daniel Chonkadze's novel with the same title.

Cast
 Hamo Beknazarian - Durmishkhani (as Aleqsandre Bek-Nazarovi)
 Mikheil Chiaureli - Osman Aga
 Shalva Dadiani - Count Tsereteli
 Tamar Sakvarelidze - Vardua (as T. Sakvarelidze)
 Tatyana Maksimova - Gaiane (as T. Maksimova)
 L. Galustyan - Zurabi
 Nino Dolidze - Nino (as N. Dolidze)
 Olga Maisuryan - Mother of Nino and Osman Aqa (as O. Maisuryan)
 N. Odankevich - Prince Mukhraneli
 Vanda Polikevich - Princess Mukhraneli (as V. Polikevich)
 Emanuel Afkhaidze - Messenger
 Valerian Gunia - Minister
 Zaqaria Berishvili (as Z. Berishvili)
 Giorgi Davitashvili

Production Designers 
 V. Akishni
 Yevgeni Lansere (as E. Lansere)
 Valerian Sidamon-Eristavi
 K. Tiri

Art Directors 
 Yevgeni Lansere (as E. Lansere)
 Valerian Sidamon-Eristavi
 (Assistant) V. Akishni
 (Assistant) K. Tiri

External links

1922 films
Kartuli Pilmi films
Soviet black-and-white films
Soviet historical adventure films
1920s historical adventure films
Soviet silent feature films
Films directed by Ivan Perestiani
Films based on Georgian novels
Soviet-era films from Georgia (country)
Adventure films from Georgia (country)
Black-and-white films from Georgia (country)
Silent feature films from Georgia (country)
Silent historical adventure films